Rhynchocinetes durbanensis, commonly known as the camel shrimp and the hingebeak prawn, is a species of shrimp (family Rhynchocinetidae) found in the Indo-Pacific. It has many white ocelli (spots) as well as a Y-shaped white mark on the upper front part of its carapace. It is strongly sexually dimorphic, and dominant males have larger first pair of chelipeds. R. durbanensis has been frequently confused with R. uritai, and also closely resembles R. brucei. R. durbanensis was first described scientifically by Isabella Gordon in 1936.

References

External links

 

Caridea
Crustaceans described in 1936